Fumigaclavine B is an ergoline compound made by certain fungi.

Both 8α and 8β diastereomers (epimers) were named fumigaclavine B in scientific literature.

See also
 Fumigaclavine A
 Fumigaclavine C
 Fumigaclavine B O-acetyltransferase

References
 https://pubchem.ncbi.nlm.nih.gov/compound/46173120#section=Top

Ergolines